Surin Hospital is the main hospital of Surin Province, Thailand. It is classified under the Ministry of Public Health as a regional hospital. It has a CPIRD Medical Education Center which trains doctors for the Institute of Medicine of Suranaree University of Technology.

History 
The funding for the construction of a hospital in Surin Province was donated by a monk "Khunaros Silakhan Khanananthamma", the abbot of Jumphon Suthawas Temple in Surin. The foundation stone was laid on 28 March 1949 and the hospital opened on 1 March 1951 as a single-storey wooden building with 50 beds and two full-time doctor. By 1956, an X-ray and Surgical Department was constructed. The hospital was then gradually expanded and became a regional hospital on 29 April 1997. It started Hospital Accreditation work (HA) in 1998 and first received ISO 9001:2000 on 2 August 2001. Today, it serves up to 914 beds with 2,709 staff.

See also 
 Healthcare in Thailand
 Hospitals in Thailand
 List of hospitals in Thailand

References 

 Article incorporates material from the corresponding article in the Thai wikipedia.

Hospitals in Thailand
Hospitals established in 1951
Surin province